Conidae, with the current common name of "cone snails", is a taxonomic family (previously subfamily) of predatory sea snails, marine gastropod molluscs in the superfamily Conoidea.

The 2014 classification of the superfamily Conoidea, groups only cone snails in the family Conidae. Some previous classifications grouped the cone snails in a subfamily, Coninae.

As of March 2015 Conidae contained over 800 recognized species. Working in 18th-century Europe, Carl Linnaeus knew of only 30 species that are still considered valid.

The snails within this family are sophisticated predatory animals. They hunt and immobilize prey using a modified radular tooth along with a venom gland containing neurotoxins; the tooth is launched out of the snail's mouth in a harpoon-like action.

Because all cone snails are venomous and capable of "stinging" humans, live ones should be handled with great care or preferably not at all.

Current taxonomy
In the Journal of Molluscan Studies, in 2014, Puillandre, Duda, Meyer, Olivera & Bouchet presented a new classification for the old genus Conus. Using 329 species, the authors carried out molecular phylogenetic analyses. The results suggested that the authors should place all living cone snails in a single family, Conidae, containing the following genera:
 Californiconus J. K. Tucker & Tenorio, 2009
 Conasprella Thiele, 1929
 † Conilithes Swainson, 1840 
 † Contraconus Olsson & Harbison, 1953 
 Conus Linnaeus, 1758
 † Eoconus J. K. Tucker & Tenorio, 2009 
 † Hemiconus Cossmann, 1889 
 † Herndliconus Petuch & Drolshagen, 2015 
 Kenyonia Brazier, 1896
 Lilliconus G. Raybaudi Massilia, 1994
 Malagasyconus Monnier & Tenorio, 2015
 † Papilliconus Tracey & Craig, 2017 
 Profundiconus Kuroda, 1956
 Pseudolilliconus J. K. Tucker & Tenorio, 2009
 Pygmaeconus Puillandre & Tenorio, 2017
 † Tequestaconus Petuch & Drolshagen, 2015 †

The authors grouped 85% of all known cone snail species under Conus. They recognized 57 subgenera within Conus, and 11 subgenera within the genus Conasprella.

History of the taxonomy

Overview
Prior to 1993, the family Conidae contained only Conus species. In 1993 significant taxonomic changes were proposed by Taylor, et al.,:  the family Conidae was redefined as several subfamilies. The subfamilies included many subfamilies that had previously been classified in the family Turridae, and the Conus species were moved to the subfamily Coninae.

In further taxonomic changes that took place in 2009 and 2011, based upon molecular phylogeny (see below), the subfamilies that were previously in the family Turridae were elevated to the status of families in their own right. This left the family Conidae once again containing only those species that were traditionally placed in that family: the cone snail species.

1993, Taylor et al., Bouchet & Rocroi
According to Taylor, et al. (1993), and the taxonomy of the Gastropoda by Bouchet & Rocroi, 2005, this family consisted of seven subfamilies.
 Coninae Fleming, 1822 — synonyms: Conulinae Rafinesque, 1815 (inv.); Textiliinae da Motta, 1995 (n.a.)
 Clathurellinae H. Adams & A. Adams, 1858 — synonyms: Defranciinae Gray, 1853 (inv.); Borsoniinae A. Bellardi, 1875; Pseudotominae A. Bellardi, 1888; Diptychomitrinae L. Bellardi, 1888; Mitrolumnidae Sacco, 1904; Mitromorphinae Casey, 1904; Lorinae Thiele, 1925
 Conorbiinae de Gregorio, 1880—synonym: Cryptoconinae Cossmann, 1896
 Mangeliinae P. Fischer, 1883—synonym: Cytharinae Thiele, 1929
 Oenopotinae Bogdanov, 1987—synonym: Lorinae Thiele, 1925 sensu Thiele
 Raphitominae A. Bellardi, 1875—synonyms: Daphnellinae Casey, 1904; Taraninae Casey, 1904; Thatcheriidae Powell, 1942; Pleurotomellinae F. Nordsieck, 1968; Andoniinae Vera-Pelaez, 2002
 † Siphopsinae Le Renard, 1995

2009, Tucker & Tenorio
In 2009 John K. Tucker and Manuel J. Tenorio proposed a classification system for the cone shells and their allies (which resorb their inner walls during growth) was based upon a cladistical analysis of anatomical characters including the radular tooth, the morphology (i.e., shell characters), as well as an analysis of prior molecular phylogeny studies, all of which were used to construct phylogenetic trees. In their phylogeny, Tucker and Tenorio noted the close relationship of the cone species within the various clades, corresponding to their proposed families and genera; this also corresponded to the results of prior molecular studies by Puillandre et al. and others.  This 2009 proposed classification system also outlined the taxonomy for the other clades of Conoidean gastropods (that do not resorb their inner walls), also based upon morphological, anatomical, and molecular studies, and removes the turrid snails (which are a distinct large and diverse group) from the cone snails, and creates a number of new families.  Tucker and Tenorio’s proposed classification system for the cone shells and their allies (and the other clades of Conoidean gastropods ) is shown in Tucker & Tenorio cone snail taxonomy 2009.

2011, Bouchet et al.
In 2011 Bouchet et al. proposed a new classification in which several subfamilies were raised to the rank of family:
 Clathurellinae was split into three families: Borsoniidae (also including species from Turridae), Mitromorphidae and Clathurellidae (all previously lumped under the Turridae).
 Conorbiinae was raised to the rank of family Conorbidae, consisting of three genera: Artemidiconus da Motta, 1991, Benthofascis Iredale, 1936, and Conorbis Swainson, 1840.
 Mangeliinae and Oenopotinae were combined and raised to the rank of family Mangeliidae, which had previously been lumped in the Turridae).
 Raphitominae was raised to the rank of family Raphitomidae (also previously lumped in the Turridae).

The classification by Bouchet et al. (2011) was based on mitochondrial DNA and nuclear DNA testing, and built on the prior work by J.K. Tucker & M.J. Tenorio (2009), but did not include fossil taxa.

Molecular phylogeny, particularly with the advent of nuclear DNA testing in addition to the mDNA testing (testing in the Conidae initially began by Christopher Meyer and Alan Kohn), is continuing on the Conidae.

2009, 2011, list of genera from Tucker & Tenorio, and Bouchet et al
This is a list of what were recognized extant genera within Conidae as per J.K. Tucker & M.J. Tenorio (2009), and Bouchet et al. (2011): However, all these genera have become synonyms of subgenera within the genus Conus as per the revision of the taxonomy of the Conidae in 2015 

 Afonsoconus Tucker & Tenorio, 2013: synonym of  Conus (Afonsoconus) Tucker & Tenorio, 2013 represented as Conus Linnaeus, 1758
 Africonus Petuch, 1975: synonym of Conus (Lautoconus) Monterosato, 1923 represented as Conus Linnaeus, 1758
 Arubaconus Petuch, 2013: synonym of Conus (Ductoconus) da Motta, 1991 represented as Conus Linnaeus, 1758
 Asprella Schaufuss, 1869: synonym of  Conus (Asprella) Schaufuss, 1869 represented as Conus Linnaeus, 1758
 Atlanticonus Petuch & Sargent, 2012: synonym of  Conus (Atlanticonus) Petuch & Sargent, 2012 represented as Conus Linnaeus, 1758
 Attenuiconus Petuch, 2013: synonym of  Conus (Attenuiconus) Petuch, 2013 represented as Conus Linnaeus, 1758
 Austroconus Tucker & Tenorio, 2009 synonym of  Conus (Austroconus) Tucker & Tenorio, 2009 represented as Conus Linnaeus, 1758
 Bathyconus Tucker & Tenorio, 2009: synonym of  Conasprella (Fusiconus) Thiele, 1929, represented as Conasprella Thiele, 1929
 Bermudaconus Petuch, 2013: synonym of  Conus (Bermudaconus) Petuch, 2013 represented as Conus Linnaeus, 1758
 Boucheticonus Tucker & Tenorio, 2013: synonym of  Conasprella (Boucheticonus) Tucker & Tenorio, 2013 represented as Conasprella Thiele, 1929
 Brasiliconus Petuch, 2013: synonym of  Conus (Brasiliconus) Petuch, 2013 represented as Conus Linnaeus, 1758
 Calamiconus Tucker & Tenorio, 2009: synonym of Conus (Lividoconus) Wils, 1970 represented as Conus Linnaeus, 1758
 Calibanus da Motta, 1991: synonym of  Conus (Calibanus) da Motta, 1991 represented as Conus Linnaeus, 1758
 Cariboconus Petuch, 2003: synonym of  Conus (Dauciconus) Cotton, 1945 represented as Conus Linnaeus, 1758
 Californiconus Tucker & Tenorio, 2009
 Chelyconus Mörch, 1852: synonym of  Conus (Chelyconus) Mörch, 1852 represented as Conus Linnaeus, 1758
 Cleobula Iredale, 1930: synonym of  Dendroconus Swainson, 1840
 Coltroconus Petuch, 2013: synonym of  Conasprella (Coltroconus) Petuch, 2013 represented as Conasprella Thiele, 1929
 Conasprella Thiele, 1929: accepted name
 Conasprelloides Tucker & Tenorio, 2009: synonym of  Conus (Dauciconus) Cotton, 1945 represented as Conus Linnaeus, 1758
 † Conilithes Swainson, 1840
 Continuconus Tucker & Tenorio, 2013
Conus Linnaeus, 1758: accepted name
 Cornutoconus Suzuki, 1972: synonym of Taranteconus Azuma, 1972
 Coronaxis Swainson, 1840: synonym of  Conus (Conus) Linnaeus, 1758 represented as Conus Linnaeus, 1758
 Cucullus Röding, 1798: synonym of  Conus (Conus) Linnaeus, 1758 represented as Conus Linnaeus, 1758
 Cylinder Montfort, 1810: synonym of  Conus (Cylinder) Montfort, 1810 represented as Conus Linnaeus, 1758
 Cylindrella Swainson, 1840: synonym of  Asprella Schaufuss, 1869synonym of  Conus (Asprella) Schaufuss, 1869 represented as Conus Linnaeus, 1758
 Cylindrus Batsch, 1789: synonym of  Cylinder Montfort, 1810synonym of  Conus (Cylinder) Montfort, 1810 represented as Conus Linnaeus, 1758
 Dalliconus Tucker & Tenorio, 2009: synonym of  Conasprella (Dalliconus) Tucker & Tenorio, 2009  synonym of Conasprella Thiele, 1929
 Darioconus Iredale, 1930: synonym of  Conus (Darioconus) Iredale, 1930 represented as Conus Linnaeus, 1758
 Dauciconus Cotton, 1945: synonym of  Conus (Dauciconus) Cotton, 1945 represented as Conus Linnaeus, 1758
 Dendroconus Swainson, 1840: synonym of  Conus (Dendroconus) Swainson, 1840 represented as Conus Linnaeus, 1758
 Ductoconus da Motta, 1991: synonym of  Conus (Ductoconus) da Motta, 1991 represented as Conus Linnaeus, 1758
 Duodenticonus Tucker & Tenorio, 2013: synonym of  Conasprella (Conasprella) Thiele, 1929 represented as Conasprella Thiele, 1929
 Dyraspis Iredale, 1949: synonym of Conus (Virroconus) Iredale, 1930 represented as Conus Linnaeus, 1758
 Elisaconus Tucker & Tenorio, 2013: synonym of Conus (Elisaconus) Tucker & Tenorio, 2013 represented as Conus Linnaeus, 1758
 Embrikena Iredale, 1937: synonym of Conus (Embrikena) Iredale, 1937 represented as Conus Linnaeus, 1758
 Endemoconus Iredale, 1931: synonym of   Conasprella (Endemoconus) Iredale, 1931 represented as Conasprella Thiele, 1929
 Eremiconus Tucker & Tenorio, 2009: synonym of Conus (Eremiconus) Tucker & Tenorio, 2009 represented as Conus Linnaeus, 1758
 Erythroconus da Motta, 1991: synonym of  Conus (Darioconus) Iredale, 1930 represented as Conus Linnaeus, 1758
 Eugeniconus da Motta, 1991: synonym of Conus (Eugeniconus) da Motta, 1991 represented as Conus Linnaeus, 1758
Floraconus Iredale, 1930: synonym of Conus (Floraconus) Iredale, 1930 represented as Conus Linnaeus, 1758
 Fraterconus Tucker & Tenorio, 2013: synonym of Conus (Fraterconus) Tucker & Tenorio, 2013 represented as Conus Linnaeus, 1758
Fulgiconus da Motta, 1991: synonym of Conus (Phasmoconus) Mörch, 1852 represented as Conus Linnaeus, 1758
 Fumiconus da Motta, 1991: synonym of  Conasprella (Fusiconus) da Motta, 1991 represented as Conasprella Thiele, 1929
Fusiconus da Motta, 1991: synonym of  Conasprella (Fusiconus) da Motta, 1991 represented as Conasprella Thiele, 1929
Gastridium Modeer, 1793: synonym of Conus (Gastridium) Modeer, 1793 represented as Conus Linnaeus, 1758
Genuanoconus Tucker & Tenorio, 2009: synonym of Conus (Kalloconus) da Motta, 1991 represented as Conus Linnaeus, 1758
Gladioconus Tucker & Tenorio, 2009: synonym of Conus (Monteiroconus) da Motta, 1991 represented as Conus Linnaeus, 1758
Globiconus Tucker & Tenorio, 2009: synonym of  Conasprella (Ximeniconus) Emerson & Old, 1962 represented as Conasprella Thiele, 1929
Gradiconus da Motta, 1991: synonym of  Conus (Dauciconus) Cotton, 1945 represented as Conus Linnaeus, 1758
 Graphiconus da Motta, 1991: synonym of Conus (Phasmoconus) Mörch, 1852 represented as Conus Linnaeus, 1758
Harmoniconus da Motta, 1991: synonym of Conus (Harmoniconus) da Motta, 1991 represented as Conus Linnaeus, 1758
Hermes Montfort, 1810: synonym of Conus (Hermes) Montfort, 1810 represented as Conus Linnaeus, 1758
 Heroconus da Motta, 1991: synonym of  Conus (Pionoconus) Mörch, 1852 represented as Conus Linnaeus, 1758
 Isoconus Tucker & Tenorio, 2013: synonym of  Conus (Splinoconus) da Motta, 1991 represented as Conus Linnaeus, 1758
Jaspidiconus Petuch, 2004: synonym of  Conasprella (Ximeniconus) Emerson & Old, 1962 represented as Conasprella Thiele, 1929
Kalloconus da Motta, 1991: synonym of Conus (Kalloconus) da Motta, 1991 represented as Conus Linnaeus, 1758
 Kellyconus Petuch, 2013: synonym of Conus (Kellyconus) Petuch, 2013 represented as Conus Linnaeus, 1758
Kenyonia Brazier, 1896: genus incertae sedis
 Kermasprella Powell, 1958: synonym of  Conasprella (Endemoconus) Iredale, 1931 represented as Conasprella Thiele, 1929
Ketyconus da Motta, 1991: synonym of Conus (Floraconus) Iredale, 1930 represented as Conus Linnaeus, 1758
Kioconus da Motta, 1991: synonym of  Conus (Splinoconus) da Motta, 1991 represented as Conus Linnaeus, 1758
 Klemaeconus Tucker & Tenorio, 2013: synonym of Conus (Klemaeconus) Tucker & Tenorio, 2013 represented as Conus Linnaeus, 1758
Kohniconus Tucker & Tenorio, 2009: synonym of  Conasprella (Kohniconus) Tucker & Tenorio, 2009 represented as Conasprella Thiele, 1929
Kurodaconus Shikama & Habe, 1968: synonym of Conus (Turriconus) Shikama & Habe, 1968 represented as Conus Linnaeus, 1758
Lamniconus da Motta, 1991: synonym of Conus (Lamniconus) da Motta, 1991 represented as Conus Linnaeus, 1758
Lautoconus Monterosato, 1923: synonym of Conus (Lautoconus) Monterosato, 1923 represented as Conus Linnaeus, 1758
Leporiconus Iredale, 1930: synonym of Conus (Leporiconus) Iredale, 1930 represented as Conus Linnaeus, 1758
Leptoconus Swainson, 1840: synonym of Conus (Leptoconus) Swainson, 1840 represented as Conus Linnaeus, 1758
Lilliconus Raybaudi Massilia, 1994: synonym of  Conasprella (Lilliconus) G. Raybaudi Massilia, 1994 represented as Conasprella Thiele, 1929
Lindaconus Petuch, 2002: synonym of Conus (Lindaconus) Petuch, 2002 represented as Conus Linnaeus, 1758
Lithoconus Mörch, 1852: synonym of Conus (Lithoconus) Mörch, 1852 represented as Conus Linnaeus, 1758
Lividoconus Wils, 1970: synonym of Conus (Lividoconus) Wils, 1970 represented as Conus Linnaeus, 1758
 Lizaconus da Motta, 1991synonym of  Profundiconus Kuroda, 1956
 Magelliconus da Motta, 1991: synonym of  Conus (Dauciconus) Cotton, 1945 represented as Conus Linnaeus, 1758
 Malagasyconus Monnier & Tenorio, 2015
 Mamiconus Cotton & Godfrey, 1932: synonym of  Endemoconus Iredale, 1931synonym of  Conasprella (Endemoconus) Iredale, 1931 represented as Conasprella Thiele, 1929
Miliariconus Tucker & Tenorio, 2009: synonym of Conus (Virroconus) Iredale, 1930 represented as Conus Linnaeus, 1758
 Mitraconus Tucker & Tenorio, 2013: synonym of Conus (Turriconus) Shikama & Habe, 1968 represented as Conus Linnaeus, 1758
Monteiroconus da Motta, 1991: synonym of Conus (Monteiroconus) da Motta, 1991 represented as Conus Linnaeus, 1758
Nataliconus Tucker & Tenorio, 2009: synonym of Conus (Leptoconus) Swainson, 1840 represented as Conus Linnaeus, 1758
 Nimboconus Tucker & Tenorio, 2013: synonym of Conus (Phasmoconus) Mörch, 1852 represented as Conus Linnaeus, 1758
 Nitidoconus Tucker & Tenorio, 2013: synonym of  Conus (Splinoconus) da Motta, 1991 represented as Conus Linnaeus, 1758
 Ongoconus da Motta, 1991: synonym of  Conus (Splinoconus) da Motta, 1991 represented as Conus Linnaeus, 1758
 Papyriconus Tucker & Tenorio, 2013: synonym of Conus (Papyriconus) Tucker & Tenorio, 2013 represented as Conus Linnaeus, 1758
Parviconus Cotton & Godfrey, 1932:  synonym of  Conasprella (Parviconus) Cotton & Godfrey, 1932 represented as Conasprella Thiele, 1929
Perplexiconus Tucker & Tenorio, 2009: synonym of  Conasprella (Ximeniconus) Emerson & Old, 1962 represented as Conasprella Thiele, 1929
Phasmoconus Mörch, 1852: synonym of Conus (Phasmoconus) Mörch, 1852 represented as Conus Linnaeus, 1758
Pionoconus Mörch, 1852: synonym of Conus (Pionoconus) Mörch, 1852 represented as Conus Linnaeus, 1758
Plicaustraconus Moolenbeek, 2008: synonym of Conus (Plicaustraconus) Moolenbeek, 2008 represented as Conus Linnaeus, 1758
 Poremskiconus Petuch, 2013: synonym of  Conus (Dauciconus) Cotton, 1945 represented as Conus Linnaeus, 1758
Profundiconus Kuroda, 1956: accepted name
Protoconus da Motta, 1991: synonym of  Tenorioconus Petuch & Drolshagen, 2011
Protostrioconus Tucker & Tenorio, 2009: synonym of Conus (Gastridium) Modeer, 1793 represented as Conus Linnaeus, 1758
Pseudoconorbis Tucker & Tenorio, 2009: synonym of Conasprella (Pseudoconorbis) Tucker & Tenorio, 2009, represented as  Conasprella Thiele, 1929
 Pseudohermes Tucker & Tenorio, 2013: synonym of Conus (Virgiconus) Cotton, 1945 represented as Conus Linnaeus, 1758
Pseudolilliconus Tucker & Tenorio, 2009: synonym of Conus (Pseudolilliconus) Tucker & Tenorio, 2009  represented as Conus Linnaeus, 1758
Pseudonoduloconus Tucker & Tenorio, 2009: synonym of Conus (Pseudonoduloconus) Tucker & Tenorio, 2009 represented as Conus Linnaeus, 1758
 Pseudopterygia Tucker & Tenorio, 2013: synonym of Conus (Pseudopterygia) Tucker & Tenorio, 2013 represented as Conus Linnaeus, 1758
Puncticulis Swainson, 1840: synonym of Conus (Puncticulis) Swainson, 1840 represented as Conus Linnaeus, 1758
Purpuriconus da Motta, 1991: synonym of  Conus (Dauciconus) Cotton, 1945 represented as Conus Linnaeus, 1758
 Pygmaeconus Puillandre & Tenorio, 2017
Pyruconus Olsson, 1967: synonym of Conus (Pyruconus) Olsson, 1967 represented as Conus Linnaeus, 1758
Quasiconus Tucker & Tenorio, 2009: synonym of Conus (Quasiconus) Tucker & Tenorio, 2009 represented as Conus Linnaeus, 1758
 Regiconus Iredale, 1930: synonym of  Conus (Darioconus) Iredale, 1930 represented as Conus Linnaeus, 1758
Rhizoconus Mörch, 1852: synonym of Conus (Rhizoconus) Mörch, 1852 represented as Conus Linnaeus, 1758
Rhombiconus Tucker & Tenorio, 2009: synonym of Conus (Stephanoconus) Mörch, 1852 represented as Conus Linnaeus, 1758
 Rhombus Montfort, 1810: synonym of  Rhombiconus Tucker & Tenorio, 2009, synonym of Conus (Stephanoconus) Mörch, 1852 represented as Conus Linnaeus, 1758
Rolaniconus Tucker & Tenorio, 2009: synonym of Conus (Strategoconus) da Motta, 1991 represented as Conus Linnaeus, 1758
 Rollus Montfort, 1810 :synonym of  Conus (Gastridium) Modeer, 1793 represented as Conus Linnaeus, 1758
 Rubroconus Tucker & Tenorio, 2013: synonym of Conus (Rubroconus) Tucker & Tenorio, 2013 represented as Conus Linnaeus, 1758
 Sandericonus Petuch, 2013: synonym of Conus (Sandericonus) Petuch, 2013 represented as Conus Linnaeus, 1758
Sciteconus da Motta, 1991: synonym of Conus (Sciteconus) da Motta, 1991 represented as Conus Linnaeus, 1758
Seminoleconus Petuch, 2003: synonym of Conus (Stephanoconus) Mörch, 1852 represented as Conus Linnaeus, 1758
 Socioconus da Motta, 1991: synonym of  Conus (Pionoconus) Mörch, 1852 represented as Conus Linnaeus, 1758
 Splinoconus da Motta, 1991: synonym of  Conus (Splinoconus) da Motta, 1991 represented as Conus Linnaeus, 1758
Spuriconus Petuch, 2003: synonym of Conus (Lindaconus) Petuch, 2002 represented as Conus Linnaeus, 1758
Stellaconus Tucker & Tenorio, 2009: synonym of  Conus (Splinoconus) da Motta, 1991 represented as Conus Linnaeus, 1758
Stephanoconus Mörch, 1852: synonym of Conus (Stephanoconus) Mörch, 1852 represented as Conus Linnaeus, 1758
Strategoconus da Motta, 1991: synonym of Conus (Strategoconus) da Motta, 1991 represented as Conus Linnaeus, 1758
 Strioconus Thiele, 1929: synonym of  Pionoconus Mörch, 1852, synonym of Conus (Pionoconus) Mörch, 1852 represented as Conus Linnaeus, 1758
 Sulciconus Bielz, 1869: synonym of  Asprella Schaufuss, 1869, synonym of  Conus (Asprella) Schaufuss, 1869 represented as Conus Linnaeus, 1758
Taranteconus Azuma, 1972: synonym of Conus (Stephanoconus) Mörch, 1852 represented as Conus Linnaeus, 1758
Tenorioconus Petuch & Drolshagen, 2011: synonym of Conus (Stephanoconus) Mörch, 1852 represented as Conus Linnaeus, 1758
 Tesselliconus da Motta, 1991: synonym of Conus (Tesselliconus) da Motta, 1991 represented as Conus Linnaeus, 1758
Textilia Swainson, 1840: synonym of Conus (Textilia) Swainson, 1840 represented Conus Linnaeus, 1758
 Thalassiconus Tucker & Tenorio, 2013: synonym of  Calibanus da Motta, 1991, synonym of  Conus (Calibanus) da Motta, 1991 represented as Conus Linnaeus, 1758
 Theliconus Swainson, 1840: synonym of  Hermes Montfort, 1810, synonym of Conus (Hermes) Montfort, 1810 represented as Conus Linnaeus, 1758
 Thoraconus da Motta, 1991: synonym of  Fulgiconus da Motta, 1991, synonym of Conus (Phasmoconus) Mörch, 1852 represented as Conus Linnaeus, 1758
Trovaoconus Tucker & Tenorio, 2009, synonym of Conus (Kalloconus) da Motta, 1991 represented as Conus Linnaeus, 1758
 Tuckericonus Petuch, 2013: synonym of  Conus (Dauciconus) Cotton, 1945 represented as Conus Linnaeus, 1758
 Tuliparia Swainson, 1840: synonym of  Gastridium Modeer, 1793, synonym of Conus (Gastridium) Modeer, 1793 represented as Conus Linnaeus, 1758
Turriconus Shikama & Habe, 1968, synonym of Conus (Turriconus) Shikama & Habe, 1968 represented as Conus Linnaeus, 1758
 Utriculus Schumacher, 1817: synonym of  Gastridium Modeer, 1793, synonym of Conus (Gastridium) Modeer, 1793 represented as Conus Linnaeus, 1758
Varioconus da Motta, 1991: synonym of Conus (Lautoconus) Monterosato, 1923 represented as Conus Linnaeus, 1758
Viminiconus Tucker & Tenorio, 2009: synonym of  Conasprella (Fusiconus) da Motta, 1991 represented as Conasprella Thiele, 1929
Virgiconus Cotton, 1945: synonym of Conus (Virgiconus) Cotton, 1945 represented as Conus Linnaeus, 1758
Virroconus Iredale, 1930: synonym of Conus (Virroconus) Iredale, 1930 represented as Conus Linnaeus, 1758
Vituliconus da Motta, 1991: synonym of Conus (Strategoconus) da Motta, 1991 represented as Conus Linnaeus, 1758
Ximeniconus Emerson & Old, 1962: synonym of  Conasprella (Ximeniconus) Emerson & Old, 1962 represented as Conasprella Thiele, 1929
Yeddoconus Tucker & Tenorio, 2009: synonym of  Conasprella (Endemoconus) Iredale, 1931 represented as Conasprella Thiele, 1929

1993 to 2011 list of genera
Following Taylor et al., from 1993 to 2011, the family Conidae was defined as including not only the cone snails, but also a large number of other genera which are commonly known as "turrids". However, as a result of molecular phylogeny studies in 2011, many of those genera were moved back to the Turridae, or were placed in new "turrid" families within the superfamily Conoidea. The following list of genera that used to be included in Conidae is retained as a historical reference:

 Abyssobela Kantor & Sysoev, 1986
 Acamptodaphne Shuto, 1971
 Agathotoma Cossman, 1899
 Aliceia Dautzenberg & Fischer, 1897
 Antimitra Iredale, 1917
 Asperdaphne Hedley, 1922
 Asprella (considered a synonym of Conus by some authors)
 Austrodaphnella Laseron, 1954
 Bactrocythara Woodring, 1928
 Bathybela Kobelt, 1905
 Bathytoma Harris & Burrows 1891
 Bela Gray, 1847
 Belaturricula Powell, 1951
 Benthomangelia Thiele, 1925
 Borsonella Dall, 1908
 Brachycythara Woodring, 1928
 Buccinaria Kittl, 1887
 Cenodagreutes E.H. Smith, 1967
 Chelyconus (synonym of Conus)
 Clathromangelia Monterosato, 1884
 Clathurella Carpenter, 1857
 Cleobula (synonym of Conus)
 Clinura Bellardi, 1875
 Clinuropsis Vincent, 1913
 Columbarium Martens, 1881
 Conasprella (considered a synonym of Conus by some authors)
 Conopleura Hinds, 1844
 Conorbis Swainson, 1840
 Conospirus Gregorio, 1890
 Conus Linnaeus, 1758
 Crockerella Hertlein & Strong 1951
 Cryoturris Woodring, 1928
 Cryptodaphne Powell, 1942
 Curtitoma Bartsch, 1941
 Daphnella Hinds 1844
 Daphnellopsis Schepman, 1913
 Darioconus (considered a synonym of Conus by some authors)
 Dauciconus (considered a synonym of Conus by some authors)
 Dendroconus (considered a synonym of Conus by some authors)
 Diaugasma Melvill, 1917
 Drilliola Locard, 1897
 Endemoconus (considered a synonym of Conus by some authors)
 Eubela Dall, 1889
 Eucyclotoma Boettger, 1895
 Euryentmema Woodring, 1928
 Exomilus Hedley, 1918
 Fehria van Aartsen, 1988
 Fusidaphne Laseron, 1954
 Gastridium (considered a synonym of Conus by some authors)
 Glyphostoma Gabb, 1872
 Glyphostomops Bartsch, 1934
 Glyphoturris Woodring, 1928
 Glyptaesopus  Pilsbry & Olsson 1941
 Granoturris Fargo, 1953
 Gymnobela Verrill, 1884
 Isodaphne Laseron, 1954
 Ithycythara Woodring, 1928
 Jaspidiconus Clench, 1942
 Kermia Oliver, 1915
 Kuroshiodaphne Shuto, 1965
 Kurtzia Bartsch, 1944
 Kurtziella Dall, 1918
 Leufroyia Monterosato 1884
 Lithoconus (considered a synonym of Conus by some authors)
 Mangelia Risso, 1826
 Microdaphne McLean, 1971
 Microgenia Laseron, 1954
 Mioawateria Vella, 1954
 Mitramorpha Adams, 1865
 Mitrolumna Bucquoy, Dautzenberg & Dollfus 1883
 Mitromorpha Adams, 1865
 Nannodiella Dall, 1918
 Neopleurotomoides Shuto, 1971
 Nepotilla Hedley, 1918
 Nipponaphera Habe, 1961
 Obesotoma Bartsch, 1941
 Oenopota Mörch, 1852
 Ophiodermella Bartsch, 1944
 Pagodidaphne Shuto, 1983
 Perplicaria Dall, 1890
 Phymorhynchus Dall, 1908
 Platycythara Woodring, 1928
 Pleurotomella verrill, 1873
 Pontiothauma E.A. Smith, 1895
 Propebela Iredale, 1918
 Pseudodaphnella Boettger, 1895
 Puncticulis Swainson, 1840
 Pyrgocythara Woodring, 1928
 Raphitoma Bellardi, 1847
 Rhizoconus (considered a synonym of Conus by some authors)
 Rimosodaphnella Cossmann, 1915
 Rocroithys Sysoev & Bouchet, 2001
 Rubellatoma Bartsch & Rehder 1939
 Rugobela Finlay, 1924
 Scalptia Jousseaume 1887
 Spergo Dall, 1895
 Stephanoconus (considered a synonym of Conus by some authors)
 Stilla Finlay, 1926
 Suavodrillia Dall, 1918
 Taranidaphne Morassi & Bonfitto, 2001
 Taranis Jeffreys, 1870
 Tasmadaphne Laseron, 1954
 Teleochilus Harris, 1897
 Tenaturris Woodring, 1928
 Teretia Norman, 1888
 Teretiopsis Kantor & Sysoev, 1989
 Thatcheria Angas, 1877
 Thatcheriasyrinx Powell, 1969
 Thatcherina Vera-Pelaez, 1998
 Thelecythara Woodring, 1928
 Thesbia Jeffreys, 1867
 Theta A.H. Clarke, 1959
 Tritonoturris Dall, 1924
 Truncadaphne McLean, 1971
 Tuskaroria Sysoev, 1988
 Typhlodaphne Powell, 1951
 Typhlomangelia Sars G.O., 1878
 Veprecula Melvill, 1917
 Vepridaphne Shuto, 1983
 Virgiconus (considered a synonym of Conus by some authors)
 Virroconus (considered a synonym of Conus by some authors)
 Xanthodaphne Powell, 1942
 Zenepos Finlay, 1928
 Zierliana Gray, 1847

Cone snail venom characteristics and biotech

There are approximately 30 records of humans killed by cone snails. Human victims suffer little pain, because the venom contains an analgesic component. Some species reportedly can kill a human in under five minutes, thus the name "cigarette snail" as supposedly  one only has time to smoke a cigarette before dying. Cone snails can sting through a wetsuit with their harpoon-like radular tooth, which resembles a transparent needle.<ref>{{cite journal | doi = 10.1038/429798a | volume=429 | issue=6994 | title=Venomous snails: One slip, and youre dead... | journal=Nature | pages=798–799 | pmid=15215832 | last1 = Nelson | first1 = L| year=2004 | s2cid=1698214 }}</ref>

Normally, cone snails (and many species in the superfamily Conoidea) use their venom to immobilize prey before engulfing it. The venom consists of a mixture of peptides, called conopeptides. The venom is typically made up of 10 to  30 amino acids, but in some species as many as 60. The venom of each cone snail species may contain as many as 200 pharmacologically active components. It is estimated that more than 50,000 conopeptides can be found, because every species of cone snail is thought to produce its own specific venom.

Cone-snail venom has come to interest biotechnologists and pharmacists because of its potential medicinal properties. Production of synthetic conopeptides has started, using solid-phase peptide synthesis.

W-conopeptide, from the species Conus magus is the basis of the analgesic drug Prialt, an approved treatment for pain said to be 1000 times as powerful as morphine and used as a last resort in specific application.  Conopeptides are also being looked at as anti-epileptic agents and to help stop nerve-cell death after a stroke or head injury. Conopeptides also have potential in helping against spasms due to spinal cord injuries, and may be helpful in diagnosing and treating small cell carcinomas in the lung.

The biotechnology surrounding cone snails and their venom has promise for medical breakthroughs; with more than 50,000 conopeptides to study, the possibilities are numerous.

See also
 ConoServer, a database of cone snail toxins, known as conopeptides. These toxins are of importance to medical research.

References

Further reading
 Kohn A. A. (1992). "Chronological Taxonomy of Conus, 1758-1840". Smithsonian Institution Press, Washington and London.
 Monteiro A. (ed.) (2007). The Cone Collector 1: 1-28.
 
 Tucker J.K. & Tenorio M.J. (2009), Systematic Classification of Recent and Fossil Conoidean Gastropods, ConchBooks, Hankenheim, Germany, 295 pp.
 Berschauer D. (2010). Technology and the Fall of the Mono-Generic Family'' The Cone Collector 15: pp. 51–54
 
 
  M.J. Tenorio, Cone radular anatomy as a proxy for phylogeny and for conotoxin diversity; researchgate.net

External links
 Nature article on the venom

 
Gastropod families